Barbarano Romano is a  (municipality) in the Province of Viterbo in the Italian region of Latium, located about  northwest of Rome and about  south of Viterbo.

Barbarano Romano borders the following municipalities: Blera, Capranica, Vejano, Vetralla, Villa San Giovanni in Tuscia.

Main sights
Medieval walls
Church of the Crucifix (Chiesa del Crocifisso), built in the 12th-13th centuries
Deconsecrated church of Sant'Angelo
Church of Santa Maria del Piano (13th-late 16th centuries)
Communal Palace
Ancient necropolis of San Giuliano

References

Cities and towns in Lazio